Bernd Rupp (born 24 February 1942) is a German former professional footballer who played as a striker. He played his only game for West Germany on 12 October 1966, scoring a goal in a 2–0 friendly win against Turkey. He scored 119 goals in the Bundesliga in 274 matches.

Honours 
Borussia Mönchengladbach
 UEFA Cup: runners-up 1972–73
 DFB-Pokal: 1972–73
 Bundesliga: runners-up 1973–74

References

External links
 
 
 

Living people
1942 births
Association football forwards
German footballers
Germany international footballers
Borussia Mönchengladbach players
SV Werder Bremen players
1. FC Köln players
Bundesliga players
20th-century German people
West German footballers